The 2002 World Karate Championships are the 16th edition of the World Karate Championships, and were held in Madrid, Spain from November 21 to November 24, 2002.

Medalists

Men

Women

Medal table

Participating nations 
751 athletes from 84 nations competed.

 (1)
 (16)
 (4)
 (7)
 (20)
 (15)
 (7)
 (4)
 (9)
 (8)
 (1)
 (5)
 (11)
 (15)
 (8)
 (2)
 (12)
 (3)
 (10)
 (1)
 (7)
 (1)
 (18)
 (2)
 (12)
 (4)
 (15)
 (19)
 (8)
 (10)
 (20)
 (9)
 (2)
 (19)
 (12)
 (5)
 (4)
 (3)
 (6)
 (6)
 (12)
 (4)
 (20)
 (8)
 (19)
 (8)
 (7)
 (4)
 (3)
 (9)
 (13)
 (1)
 (10)
 (10)
 (9)
 (7)
 (5)
 (8)
 (5)
 (11)
 (3)
 (8)
 (16)
 (5)
 (2)
 (16)
 (15)
 (12)
 (4)
 (12)
 (6)
 (19)
 (4)
 (12)
 (12)
 (19)
 (18)
 (8)
 (12)
 (7)
 (2)
 (4)
 (3)
  (18)

References

External links
 World Karate Federation
 Karate Records – World Championship 2002
 Day 1 resultsDay 2 resultsDay 3 resultsDay 4 results

World Championships
Karate Championships
2002
International karate competitions hosted by Spain
Karate competitions in Spain
2002 in Madrid
November 2002 sports events in Europe